Pterostylis anatona, commonly known as the Eungella greenhood, is a species of orchid endemic to Queensland. It has a rosette of wrinkled leaves at the base of the plant and a single light green and white flower, reddish towards its tip. It grows in higher areas between Eungella and the Blackdown Tableland National Park.

Description
The dorsal sepal and petals are fused, forming a hood or "galea" over the column. The dorsal sepal is slightly shorter than the petals. There is a wide gap between the galea and the lateral sepals. Flowering occurs from June to August.

Taxonomy and naming
Pterostylis anatona was first formally described in 1997 by David Jones and the description was published in The Orchadian from a specimen collected near Eungella. The specific epithet (anatona) is a Latin word meaning "stretching or extending upward".

Distribution and habitat
The Eungella greenhood grows in forest with a grassy understorey above  between Eungella and the Blackdown Tableland.

References

anatona
Endemic orchids of Australia
Orchids of Queensland
Plants described in 1997